"World Without Superman" is a Superman comic book story arc published by DC Comics. It takes place in Action Comics written by Greg Rucka with art by Sidney Teles and Superman written by James Robinson with art by Renato Guedes. The story deals with Metropolis dealing with a world without Superman, who has gone to live on New Krypton to keep General Zod in check. As a result, the two Superman series, Action Comics and Superman star Nightwing & Flamebird and Mon-El respectively.

Plot summary

Superman
When Superman leaves Earth for New Krypton, he appoints Mon-El, newly freed from the Phantom Zone, to take his place as guardian of Metropolis. Mon-El assumes the secret identity of Jonathan Kent as a tribute to Clark's adoptive father, posing as Clark's cousin. The series directly leads into the Codename Patriot crossover.

Action Comics: The Sleepers
Kryptonians Chris Kent and Thara Ak-Var become the superheroes Nightwing and Flamebird on Earth and are being hunted by Ursa. The mission of the two superheroes is to hunt down Zod's sleeper agents on Earth and return them to the Phantom Zone. They start by hunting down sleeper agent Tor-Ann, who was secretly posing as a human in Australia. Next, they are confronted by Ursa, who sadistically slashes Flamebird with a Kryptonite knife, but is taken down by Nightwing before Ursa can kill Thara. Chris and Thara survive the encounter, and then go see Chris's adoptive mother, Lois. Lois sees to it that Thara is cured from the Kryptonite attack with the help of Dr. Light. The next mission of the Kryptonian duo deals with taking down Nadira Var-Em and Az-Rel, who are described as Krypton's equivalent of Bonnie and Clyde. This ends with Nightwing and Flamebird losing the track of the two criminals, who are held captive by Sam Lane. The series then also leads into the Codename Patriot crossover.

References

See also
Superman: New Krypton
Superman: World of New Krypton
War of the Supermen

Comics by Greg Rucka